"Superstar" is a song written by Cutfather, Joe Belmaati, and Remee and performed by Danish pop singer Christine Milton. It was released in 2003 as the lead single from her debut studio album, Friday (2004), and spent seven weeks at number one on the Danish Singles Chart. The song was later covered to international success by British singer Jamelia.

According to a HitQuarters interview with co-writer and producer Cutfather, the song was initially inspired by Liberty X's "Just a Little" (2002), "I liked that song and wanted to do something, not similar, but something in that vibe", he said.

Track listings

 CD promo
 "Superstar" – 3:33

 CD single
 "Superstar" – 3:33
 "Superstar" (Mestarr Radio Edit) – 3:36

 CD maxi single / Download
 "Superstar" – 3:33
 "Superstar" (Mestarr Radio Edit) – 3:36
 "Superstar" (Mestarr Club Mix) – 6:55
 "Superstar" (Instrumental) – 3:33

Personnel
Credits are lifted from the single liner notes.
 Songwriting – Remee, Joe Belmaati, Mich Hansen
 Production, arrangement and recording – Cutfather & Joe
 Co-production – Remee
 Keyboards, guitar and programming – Joe Belmaati
 Percussion – Mich Hansen
 Rap and backing vocals – Remee
 Backing vocals – Szhirley Rasmussen
 Mixing – Mads Nilsson, Cutfather & Joe
 Mastering – Björn Engelmann

Charts

Certifications

Jamelia cover

"Superstar" was covered by British R&B singer Jamelia for her second studio album, Thank You. It was released as the album's second single on 15 September 2003 through Parlophone. The song entered the UK Singles Chart at number eight but as airplay, video play and the general awareness of the track increased, after a month on the track climbed to a peak of number three. "Superstar" became the 26th biggest-selling single of 2003 and has sold 400,000 copies in the UK as of 2019. The single has been certified platinum by the British Phonographic Industry, spending 20 weeks on the UK chart.

"Superstar" also saw worldwide chart success, peaking at number one in Australia and New Zealand and attaining top-ten positions in over 15 other countries. The song earned the songwriters an Ivor Novello Award for "Most Performed Work", being the most performed song in the United Kingdom in 2003. According to the Performing Right Society, "Superstar" was the fourth most popular song of the 2000s (decade) in the UK based on the amount of plays and performances.

Music video
The music video for "Superstar" was directed by Dominic Leung.

Track listings
 UK CD1
 "Superstar" 
 "Superstar" 
 "Ayo Superstar" 
 "Superstar" 

 UK CD2 and European CD single
 "Superstar" 
 "Bounce" 

 UK 12-inch single
A1. "Ayo Superstar" 
A2. "Superstar" 
B1. "Superstar" 
B2. "Superstar" 

 Australasian CD single
 "Superstar" – 3:34
 "Ayo Superstar" – 3:51
 "Superstar"  – 4:12
 "Superstar"

Credits and personnel
Credits are lifted from the Thank You album booklet.

Studios
 Recorded at Cutfather & Joe Studios (Copenhagen, Denmark)
 Mixed at White Room (Copenhagen, Denmark)

Personnel
 Remee – writing, rap
 Mich Hansen – writing, percussion
 Joe Belmaati – writing, guitar, keys, programming, recording
 Cutfather & Joe – production, mixing
 Mads Nilsson – mixing

Charts

Weekly charts

Year-end charts

Certifications

Release history

Other versions
In January 2017, Polish Mandee and Maria Mathea released a new version of the song. In March 2020, a remixed cover of the song was released by British girl group Four of Diamonds and Dutch DJ and producer Joe Stone.

References

2003 songs
2003 debut singles
2003 singles
Christine Milton songs
Jamelia songs
Number-one singles in Australia
Number-one singles in the Czech Republic
Number-one singles in Denmark
Number-one singles in New Zealand
Song recordings produced by Cutfather & Joe
Songs written by Cutfather
Songs written by Remee
Bertelsmann Music Group singles
RCA Records singles
Parlophone singles